Novo Virje is a municipality in the Koprivnica-Križevci county in Croatia. According to the 2001 census, there are 1,412 inhabitants in the area, with Croats forming an absolute majority.

History
In the late 19th century and early 20th century, Novo Virje was part of the Bjelovar-Križevci County of the Kingdom of Croatia-Slavonia.

External links
 Novo Virje

Municipalities of Croatia
Populated places in Koprivnica-Križevci County